Berapit is a state constituency in Penang, Malaysia, that has been represented in the Penang State Legislative Assembly.

The state constituency was first contested in 1986 and is mandated to return a single Assemblyman to the Penang State Legislative Assembly under the first-past-the-post voting system. , the State Assemblywoman for Berapit is Heng Lee Lee from the Democratic Action Party (DAP), which is part of the state's ruling coalition, Pakatan Harapan (PH).

Definition

Polling districts 
According to the federal gazette issued on 30 March 2018, the Berapit constituency is divided into 8 polling districts.

Demographics

History

Election results
The electoral results for the Berapit state constituency from 1986 to 2018 are as follows.

See also 
 Constituencies of Penang

References

Penang state constituencies